Leif Børresen (16 January 1909 – 25 October 1990) was a Norwegian footballer. He played in one match for the Norway national football team in 1931.

References

External links
 

1909 births
1990 deaths
Norwegian footballers
Norway international footballers
People from Larvik
Association football forwards
IF Fram Larvik players
Boldklubben 1909 players
Norwegian expatriate footballers
Expatriate men's footballers in Denmark